Martín Adrián Palavicini (born August 15, 1977 in Rosario, Santa Fe) is an Argentine football striker currently playing for Universitario de Sucre in the Liga de Fútbol Profesional Boliviano.

In 2004, Palavicini made his professional debut in Bolivia with modest club Real Santa Cruz. Subsequently, he transferred to Oriente Petrolero, where he played until 2007. The following year he joined another Bolivian club, San José. In 2010 signing for the club Real Mamoré. In July 2011 after the team was relegated he signed for club Petrolero. In July 2013 he transferred to Universitario de Sucre. Palavicini finished as the topscorer in the 2015 Clausura tournament with 13 goals.

External links
 
 

1977 births
Living people
Footballers from Rosario, Santa Fe
Argentine footballers
Association football forwards
Oriente Petrolero players
Club San José players
Municipal Real Mamoré players
Expatriate footballers in Bolivia
Argentine expatriate sportspeople in Bolivia